Usami (written: 宇佐美) is a Japanese surname. Notable people with the surname include:

, Japanese long-distance runner
, Japanese volleyball player
Fumio Usami (born 1968), Japanese mixed martial artist
, Japanese footballer
, Japanese rugby union player
, Japanese banker and businessman
Masashi Usami, Japanese engineer
, Japanese samurai
, Japanese AV director
, Japanese footballer
, Japanese field hockey player
, Japanese dancer

See also
Usami Station, a railway station in Itō, Shizuoka Prefecture, Japan

Japanese-language surnames